Local elections in Tacloban City, Leyte were held on May 9, 2022, within the Philippine general election. Registered voters of the city elected candidates for the following elective local posts: mayor, vice mayor, and ten councilors. As part of Leyte's 1st congressional district, Tacloban City voters also elected a district representative.

There are 143,562 eligible voters in the city for this election, and according to partial and unofficial results, there were 123,120 votes cast, giving a voter turnout of 85.76%.

Background 
Incumbent mayor Alfred Romualdez of the Nacionalista Party filed his candidacy for a second consecutive term in this election. He was challenged by term-limited incumbent vice mayor Jerry Yaokasin, who ran as an independent. They were both unopposed in their respective races in the 2019 elections.

Mayor Romualdez was joined by his son, Raymund, as his running mate. Vice mayor Yaokasin chose former vice mayor and councilor Edwin Chua as his running mate. Romualdez and Chua were nominated by Nacionalista Party and Aksyon Demokratiko, respectively.

Results 
The candidates for mayor and vice mayor with the highest number of votes wins the seat; they are voted separately, therefore, they may be of different parties when elected.

Mayoral Election 
Parties are as stated in their certificate of candidacies. Alfred Romualdez is the incumbent.

Vice Mayoral Election 
Parties are as stated in their certificate of candidacies.

City Council Election 
Voters elected ten councilors to comprise the City Council or the Sangguniang Panlungsod. Candidates are voted for separately so winning candidates may come from different political parties. The ten candidates with the highest number of votes win the seats. For the tickets, names that are italicized were incumbents seeking reelection.

Team Romualdez

Team Yaokasin

Results 

|-bgcolor=black
|colspan=5|

References

External links 

 Official website of the Commission on Elections
 Official website of the Parish Pastoral Council for Responsible Voting (PPCRV)

2022 Philippine local elections
Elections in Leyte (province)
Tacloban
May 2022 events in the Philippines